Monaco is a sovereign principality in Western Europe. 

Monaco may also refer to:

Places and jurisdictions 
 Monaco-Ville, the old town of the principality and one of its administrative divisions
 Monaco, New Zealand, a suburb of Nelson, New Zealand
 Monaco di Baviera, the Italian name for the Bavarian capital, Munich (southern Germany)

People 
 Monaco (name), a surname, and a list of people with the name

Sport and games 
 AS Monaco FC, Monegasque football club participating in French professional league
 Monaco Grand Prix, a Formula 1 motor-racing event held in the principality
Circuit de Monaco, the street circuit where the Monaco Grand Prix is held.
 Monaco: What's Yours Is Mine, a stealth and action video game by Pocketwatch Games
 Juan Mónaco, an Argentine tennis player

Computing and Internet 
 Monaco (typeface), a monospaced font shipping with macOS
Monaco (editor), a web-based code editor used by Visual Studio Code 
 Microsoft Monaco, codename for a music-making program under development (list of Microsoft codenames)
 Monaco, a CSS wiki layout by Wikia

Other uses 
 Monaco (band), a 1996–2000 band consisting of Peter Hook and David Potts
 Monaco (album), a 2000 album by the eponymous band
 Dodge Monaco, a model of automobile
 Monaco Coach Corporation, a manufacturer of recreational vehicles
 TAG Heuer Monaco, a wristwatch
 , a Panamanian coaster

See also
 Monoco, a 17th-century Nashaway chief